Xizhi is an inner city district in eastern New Taipei City in northern Taiwan, and is located between Taipei City and Keelung City. Compared to most districts in eastern New Taipei, which are very sparsely populated, Xizhi is one of the more populated districts in New Taipei, with a population of 207,004 people as of February 2023.

Xizhi grew quickly during the 1980s and 1990s, and is home to many of Taiwan's major electronics companies, such as Acer, Garmin (Asia), Coiler, Lanner Electronics and DFI.

Name origin 
The district's old name Tsui-tng-ka refers to the fact that the tide from the Keelung River stops at Xizhi and goes back to the sea. This is the source of the current name.

History
The area was originally called Kypanas (Basay: Kippanas) by the  indigenous Ketagalan people.

In 1758, Han immigrants built a settlement near the area.

In 1920, during the Japanese rule, the place was organized as Shiodome Town, Shichisei District, Taihoku Prefecture.

After the handover of Taiwan from Japan to the Republic of China, Xizhi was established as an urban township of Taipei County. It was upgraded to a county-administered city on 1 July 1999. On 25 December 2010, it became a district of New Taipei City.

Geography and location 

Xizhi is located in the Keelung River valley between Taipei and Keelung, which is an important transportation corridor. The old Jukando Highway and  passed through here during the Japanese period. Currently both north–south freeways (National Highway 1 and National Highway 3) as well as the West Coast Line railroad pass through Xizhi.

A Taipei Metro (Taipei Rapid Transit System) route is planned for Xizhi.

Xizhi suffered from periodic flooding due to typhoons, before a levee was completed along the Keelung River in 2002.

Economy 

Many of Taiwan's electronics companies are headquartered in Xizhi, such as:
Acer Group, an international computer company 
Coiler Corporation, a telecommunications company
Lanner Electronics Inc., a company making computer parts, network appliance platforms, and motherboards
DFI (Diamond Flower Inc.), a company making computer motherboards

Garmin's largest operating subsidiary, Garmin (Asia) Corporation, has its main office in Xizhi District.

Matsusei, a Taiwanese supermarket chain, also has its headquarters in Xizhi.

Farglory U-Town, a commerce center with multiple functions, such as entertainment, business, and dining areas, was built by Farglory Group (遠雄企業), and was completed at the end of 2014. It is located in one of the most convenient and centralized areas of the whole Xizhi District. Around U-Town, there are hypermarkets, such as Carrefour and Costco, international computer companies, such as Acer, and retailer of consumer electronics and entertainment software, such as TK3C. There are 1482 units in total within 37 stories along with underground 7 floors. Among those units, B1 is designed as a public food court, 1F~3F house international designers branding department store, and 4F is a fitness center. The remaining floors also include the lobby, Farglory Museum, a spa, swimming pool, business meeting rooms as well as offices.

Before several electronic companies moved to Xizhi, the district, like the nearby Pinglin, was known for the production of Baozhong tea.

Tourist attractions
 Wuzhi Mountain Military Cemetery
 Xizhi Gongbei Temple

Transportation

 TRA Wudu Station
 TRA Xizhi Station
 TRA Xike Station
Planned (Taipei Metro Minsheng–Xizhi line)
Metro Taipei Zhangshuwan station
Metro Taipei Xizhi Tech. Park station
Metro Taipei Xizhi station

Notable natives
 Chen Zhiqi, painter
 Huang Kuo-chang, leader of the New Power Party (2015–2019)
 Shen Fa-hui, member of the Legislative Yuan (2005–2008)
 Yang Chao-hsiang, Minister of Education (1999–2000)

See also
 New Taipei City

References

External links 

  

Districts of New Taipei